Yevhen Bredun; Yevgeniy Bredun (born 10 September 1982) is a Ukrainian (until 2015), Russian former footballer.

Career
Bredun began his professional career with Ukrainian Premier League club Shakhtar Donetsk, spending most of his time on loan to other Ukrainian clubs. He joined PFC Sevastopol in 2010.

In 2015 Bredun return to Sevastopol and participates in the Crimean championship.

He made 8 appearances for the U-21 national team.

External links
 
 
 

1982 births
Living people
Footballers from Kramatorsk
Ukrainian footballers
Association football midfielders
FC Shakhtar Donetsk players
FC Mariupol players
FC Arsenal Kyiv players
FC Metalurh Zaporizhzhia players
FC Gomel players
FC Sevastopol players
FC Borysfen Boryspil players
FC Tytan Donetsk players
FC Belshina Bobruisk players
FC Helios Kharkiv players
Expatriate footballers in Belarus
Ukrainian expatriate footballers
Crimean Premier League players
FC Sevastopol (Russia) players
FC Hvardiyets Hvardiiske players
Naturalised citizens of Russia
Russian footballers